Martin Joseph Bolger (19 August 1906 – 28 July 1991) was an Australian rules footballer who played in the VFL between 1930 and 1939 for the Richmond Football Club.

A member of the Tigers' legendary "Three Musketeers" backline of Bolger, Sheahan and O'Neill, he played in the 1929 Seconds premiership side as well as in four straight senior Grand Finals from 1931 to 1934, winning the premiership in 1932 and 1934.

Bolger was awarded Life Membership in 1939.

Later serving as a committeeman and vice president of the club, his service to the Richmond Football Club exceeded 50 years.

References 

 Hogan P: The Tigers Of Old, Richmond FC, Melbourne 1996
 Richmond Football Club - Hall of Fame

External links
 
 

Richmond Football Club players
Richmond Football Club Premiership players
Australian rules footballers from Melbourne
1906 births
1991 deaths
Two-time VFL/AFL Premiership players
People from Hawthorn, Victoria